Bruno Kuzuhara (born 1 April 2004) is a Brazilian-born American tennis player. He won the 2022 Australian Open Juniors singles and doubles events.

Personal life
Born in Brazil, both his parents have Japanese heritage. They moved to the U.S. when he was a baby. He now lives in Coconut Creek, Florida. He has trained under Brian Baker at the national campus in Florida.

Career
He was given his ATP tour debut as a wildcard at the 2021 US Open in the mixed doubles alongside Elvina Kalieva.

As the top seed, he won the 2022 Australian Open in Boys singles defeating Czech Jakub Menšík. He also won the doubles event partnering Hong Kong player Coleman Wong. At 17 years old he became the fourth player from the US in the Open Era to claim the junior singles title, following in the footsteps of Andy Roddick, Donald Young and Sebastian Korda. He was also the first player since Czech Jiří Veselý in 2011 to sweep the singles and doubles events.

ATP Challenger and ITF Futures finals

Singles: 2 (0–2)

Doubles: 6 (3–3)

Junior Grand Slam finals

Singles: 1 (1 title)

Doubles: 1 (1 title)

ITF World Tennis Tour Juniors

Singles: 10 (5 titles, 5 runners-up)

Doubles: 6 (1 title, 5 runners-up)

Notes

References

External links
 
 

2004 births
Living people
American male tennis players
American sportspeople of Japanese descent
Japanese-American tennis players
Brazilian emigrants to the United States
Grand Slam (tennis) champions in boys' singles
Grand Slam (tennis) champions in boys' doubles
Australian Open (tennis) junior champions